Charles Huhn (born January 11, 1951) is an American rock singer and guitarist. He got his start playing with Vic Amato, Andy Dennen and Al Lesert in the band Cirrus, in and around Grand Rapids, Michigan, playing many gigs in West Michigan before joining Ted Nugent in 1978.

Career

Ted Nugent 
Born in 1951 in Portland, Oregon, Huhn moved to Grand Rapids, Michigan at the age of four when he began his music career.  He started with piano and voice lessons, and soon after taught himself the guitar.  He began performing in rock bands in 1967, initially with Cirrus, composed of high school friends; in 1973, he performed in Tanglewood, a full-time successful mid-west bar band.  In 1975, after graduating from Michigan State with a bachelor's degree in Social Sciences, he then played with longtime friend and drummer Vic Amato for two and a half years, before auditioning for Ted Nugent.  He came to prominence when he joined Ted Nugent's band in 1978. Huhn replaced band member Derek St. Holmes, and was thrust immediately into the spotlight. At the time Huhn joined Ted Nugent, it was one of the hottest acts in the world.

Huhn handled lead vocals on the classic Nugent anthem "Weekend Warriors", and was also featured prominently on the album of the same name, which sold more than a million copies, going platinum within a week of release. Huhn remained with Ted Nugent's band until 1982, and recorded three studio albums and one live album during his tenure. Another live recording from a 1979 show at London's Hammersmith Odeon was later released in 1998.

After leaving Ted Nugent, Huhn worked briefly with Irish guitar legend Gary Moore on his album Dirty Fingers, toured with Moore for some gigs in August 1982.  He would leave to pursue an offer from Geffen Records to write songs with future Yes guitarist Trevor Rabin and to put a band together with bassist Mark Andes and drummer Frankie Banali. The group recorded demos but nothing came of it.

His next job was frontman for the band Victory, a group based in Hannover, Germany.  He recorded four releases as Victory's original lead vocalist, guitarist and songwriter, and the band had minor success with their 1986 single "The Check's in the Mail".  He left the group in early 1988 to play with Jerry Shirley and Humble Pie.  He would also team up with former Alice Cooper band rhythm section Neal Smith and Dennis Dunaway and Blue Öyster Cult's Joe Bouchard in a project called Deadringer, resulting in the release of the album Electrocution of the Heart in 1989.

Humble Pie 
In 1988, former Humble Pie and Fastway drummer Jerry Shirley organized a new version of Humble Pie in which he would be the group's leader and only original member. He hired Huhn as the group's lead singer, which worked quite well as the band's original vocalist Steve Marriott and Huhn had very similar vocal styles. Humble Pie Featuring Jerry Shirley was based in Cleveland, Ohio, where Shirley worked as a DJ at a classic rock radio station. Huhn and Shirley were the mainstays in the band, and together with numerous rotating musicians performed Humble Pie music regularly all over the United States for the next ten years. No official recordings with Huhn as the band's singer were ever released, although the group was broadcast live on special radio concerts on several occasions, and bootlegs of those performances do exist. During the latter part of the 1990s, Jerry Shirley developed a string of legal problems and moved back to his native England, taking the Humble Pie name with him. Huhn ended his longtime stint with Shirley in 1999.

Between 1993 and 1995, Huhn fronted Michigan band No Mercy with Brownsville Station's Michael Lutz on bass, Ted Nugent, Blackfoot drummer Gunner Ross and Scotty Anderson on lead guitar. Huhn and Ross had also played together in the Detroit band The Almighty Strut in the early '80's.

Foghat 

Since 2000, Huhn has been the lead vocalist for another classic rock act, Foghat. Original Foghat vocalist Dave Peverett died of cancer in 2000, and the band's remaining members wanted to continue performing. Huhn accepted the band's offer to join.  Aside from his vocal duties, Huhn also plays guitar. Although Bryan Bassett (formerly of Wild Cherry and Molly Hatchet) handled most of the lead guitar work, Huhn provided steady rhythms and played some solos as well. Since joining Foghat, Huhn has recorded three studio releases: Family Joules (2002), Last Train Home (2010), and Under the Influence (2016); and three live releases: Foghat Live II (2007), a double-disc collection featuring the band's greatest hits; Live at the Blues Warehouse, originally a live session for DJ Mark Klein’s weekly ‘Long Island Blues Warehouse Radio Show’; and a live show from the Under the Influence Tour, Live at the Bottoms Up. Huhn can also be seen on two DVD releases: 2005's Official Bootleg DVD - Vol. 1 (2002 - 2004); and Live in St. Pete, issued in December 2013.

In 2003, he took part in a reunion with his former Victory bandmates. The result was the CD release Instinct. Huhn declined an offer to rejoin Victory as the band's permanent lead vocalist, and chose instead to continue his work with Foghat. In 2007, he recorded an album with guitarist Matt Roehr, formerly of German superstars Böhse Onkelz.

He remained a vital part of Foghat until January 21, 2022, when Foghat announced that Charlie Huhn "decided to retire, via email, on very short notice". They are carrying on with new vocalist and guitarist Scott Holt.

Discography

with Foghat
 Family Joules (2002)
 Official Bootleg DVD - Vol. 1 (2002-2004) (2005)
 Foghat Live II (2007)
 Live at the Blues Warehouse (2009)
 Last Train Home (2010)
 Live in St. Pete DVD (2013)
 Under the Influence (2016)
 8 Days on the Road (2021)

with Matt Roehr
 Barra da Tijuca (2007)

with Deadringer
 Electrocution of the Heart (1989)

with Axel Rudi Pell
 Wild Obsession (1989)

with Victory
 Victory (1985)
 Don't Get Mad... Get Even (1986)
 Hungry Hearts (1987)
 That's Live (1988)
 Instinct (2003)

with Gary Moore
 Dirty Fingers (1983)

with Ted Nugent
 Weekend Warriors (1978)
 State of Shock (1979)
 Scream Dream (1980)
 Intensities in 10 Cities (1981)

References

External links

Foghat / Charlie Huhn interview (travellersintime.com)

American rock singers
American heavy metal guitarists
1951 births
Living people
Michigan State University alumni
Musicians from Grand Rapids, Michigan
The Gary Moore Band members
Singers from Michigan
Guitarists from Michigan
American male guitarists
20th-century American guitarists
Ted Nugent Band members
20th-century American male musicians